Uyghur is a Turkic language with a long literary tradition spoken in Xinjiang, China by the Uyghurs. Today, the Uyghur Arabic alphabet is the official writing system used for Uyghur in Xinjiang, whereas other alphabets like the Uyghur Latin and Uyghur Cyrillic alphabets are still in use outside China, especially in Central Asia.

History

Old Uyghur and Modern Uyghur

The Old Uyghur language and Modern Uyghur are distinct Turkic languages and are not different stages of the same language. The Old Uyghur language is ancestral to Western Yugur, while modern Uyghur is descended from one of the Karluk languages.

Old Uyghur alphabets

5th to 18th century 
In the 5th century Old Uyghur was written for the first time using the Sogdian alphabet. This fell out of use during the 10th century, when it evolved into the Old Uyghur alphabet, although it was taken into use again between the 15th and 16th century. While the Sogdian alphabet was still in use, it was written with the Old Turkic alphabet from the 6th-9th centuries.

The Old Uyghur language evolved into the modern Western Yugur, and remained in use until the 18th century among the Yugur.

Modern Uyghur alphabets

10th century to 19th century
An Arabic alphabet introduced along with Islam in the 10th century to the Karluk Kara Khanids, which evolved into the modern day Uyghur Arabic alphabet.

The Arabic-derived alphabet taken into use first came to be the so-called Chagatai script, which was used for writing the Chagatai language and the Turki (modern Uyghur) language, but fell out of use in the early 1920s, when the Uyghur-speaking areas variously became a part of, or under the influence of, the Soviet Union.

The Chagatai alphabet was known as Kona Yëziq ("Old script").
و
The Syriac alphabet has also been used for writing Old Uyghur at some time between the 5th century and 19th century.

20th to 21st century 

The writing of Uyghur saw many changes during the 20th century mostly to do with political decisions, both from the Soviet and Chinese side. The Soviet Union first tried to romanize the writing of the language, but soon after decided to promote a Cyrillic script during the late 1920s known as the Uyghur Cyrillic alphabet, fearing that a romanization of the language would strengthen the relationship of the Uyghurs with other Turkic peoples.

With the establishment of the People's Republic of China in 1949, the promotion of a Cyrillic script began, but when the tensions between the Soviet Union and China grew during the late 1950s, the Chinese devised a new alphabet based upon Pinyin and Cyrillic (with some letters borrowed from the Soviet's Uniform Turkic Alphabet – a Cyrillic-influenced Latin alphabet, with Latin letters like Ə, Ƣ, Ⱨ, Ɵ, etc.), which is known as the Uyghur New Script and promoted this instead, and which soon became the official alphabet of usage for almost 10 years.

In 1982 Uyghur new script was abolished, the Arabic alphabet was reinstated in a modified form as the Uyghur Arabic alphabet. However, due to the increasing importance of information technology, there have been requests for a Latin alphabet, for easier use on computers. This resulted in five conferences between 2000 and 2001, where a Latin-derived auxiliary alphabet was devised known as the Uyghur Latin alphabet.

Present situation 

Today, the Uyghur language is written using five different alphabets, which are:
 UEY: the Uyghur Arabic alphabet, the only official alphabet in the Xinjiang province of China and is widely used in government, social media and in everyday life;
 UKY: the Uyghur Cyrillic alphabet is mostly used by Uyghurs living in Central Asian countries, especially in Kazakhstan;
 ALA-LC Uighur: the slightly-revised version dating from 2015 of the Romanized Uighur transliteration of the Library of Congress and the American Library Association is the standard used by WorldCat (a union-catalog that itemizes the collections of tens of thousands of institutions, mostly libraries, in many countries, that are current or past members of the OCLC global cooperative) and also has variants that make typing of it on computer easier (such as that of De Jong, Frederick.  A Grammar of Modern Uyghur.  Utrecht: Houtsma, 2007, who substitutes for its ă, ö, ü, and v respectively ae, oe, ue, and w, these being options suggested by German); 
 ULY: the Uyghur Latin alphabet differs from the preceding in a few details and was introduced in 2008 and to be used solely in computer-related fields as an ancillary writing system, but has now largely fallen into disuse after the expanded availability of UEY keyboards and keypads on all devices.
 UYY: the mixed Uyghur New Script (also called Pinyin Yeziⱪi or UPNY), this alphabet is also Latin-based, but now most people who want to type in Latin use ULY instead.

In the table below, the alphabets are shown side-by-side for comparison, together with phonetic transcription in the International Phonetic Alphabet. It is only grouped by phonemic proximity; each alphabet has its own sorting order. Some letter forms that are used for words borrowed from other languages (notably proper names), or kept occasionally from older orthographic conventions, are shown in parentheses.

Differences may still exist in texts using ULY (the most recently devised of the Latin orthographies) in that its standard  is sometimes written by instead , that is to say, with the acute accent in place of the diaeresis, without this variation denoting any difference in Uyghur pronunciation.

Some words may still use the Cyrillic soft sign. Also, loanwords of Russian origin are often spelled as they are in Russian, and thus not adapted to Uyghur orthography.

Another notable feature of the Uyghur New Script is the use of the letter  to represent  (sometimes incorrectly rendered as ). This letter has erroneously been named LATIN LETTER OI in Unicode, although it is correctly referred to as gha and replaced by the digraph  in the newer Uyghur Latin alphabet.

In the ALA-LC Uighur Romanization and the Uyghur Latin alphabet, only the ISO basic Latin alphabet is needed plus in the way of diacritic marks that occur above vowels (which are supported by many fonts and encoding standards) only: in both spellings diaeresis (umlaut) and in the ALA-LC breve as well. The letter  is only used in the  digraph, and the letter  is normally not used in the Uyghur Latin except in loanwords, where a difference exists between foreign  and native . Users have found this variation in spelling acceptable as long as it does not obscure any semantic distinction.

One of the major differences among the four alphabets is the rules of when the glottal stop  is written. 

In Uyghur Arabic alphabet, it is consistently written, using the hamza on a tooth , including at the beginning of words. However, in that position, the glottal stop is not considered by Uyghurs a separate letter, but rather to be just a support for the vowel that follow.

In the Uyghur Cyrillic alphabet and Uyghur New Script, the glottal stop was only written word-medially, using an apostrophe, but it is not required and thus not very consistent.

Example 
Below is the same text in Uyghur, but written using each of the four alphabets in common use today.

The text is taken from the first article of the Universal Declaration of Human Rights.

References

Citations

Sources 

   Rev. ed. of its section about Uighur, at https://www.loc.gov/catdir/cpso/romanization/uighur.pdf, on line since 2015.

External links 
 A JavaScript-based web tool for converting among multiple Uyghur scripts
 Web tool for converting between Uyghur alphabets
 Also a web tool for converting between Uyghur alphabets
 an open-source python program for converting between Uyghur alphabets
 About Latin Script Uyghur (originally: Uyghur Computer Writing -- UKY)
 How can I write "Öö Üü ëë" on my English keyboard?

Arabic alphabets
Cyrillic alphabets
Latin alphabets
Alphabets used by Turkic languages
Uyghur language

it:Alfabeto uiguro